Duncanville is an unincorporated community in Crawford County, Illinois, United States. Duncanville is located half a mile west of Illinois Route 1. Duncanville has approximately 35 homes and 75 residents. Duncanville is the home to the New Hope Baptist Church.

References

Unincorporated communities in Crawford County, Illinois
Unincorporated communities in Illinois